43rd National Board of Review Awards
January 3, 1972
The 43rd National Board of Review Awards were announced on January 3, 1972.

Top Ten Films 
Macbeth
The Boy Friend
One Day in the Life of Ivan Denisovich
The French Connection
The Last Picture Show
Nicholas and Alexandra
The Go-Between
King Lear
The Tales of Beatrix Potter
Death in Venice

Top Foreign Films 
Claire's Knee
Bed and Board
The Clowns
The Garden of the Finzi-Continis
The Conformist

Winners 
Best Film:
Macbeth
Best Foreign Film:
Claire's Knee
Best Actor:
Gene Hackman - The French Connection
Best Actress:
Irene Papas - The Trojan Women
Best Supporting Actor:
Ben Johnson - The Last Picture Show
Best Supporting Actress:
Cloris Leachman - The Last Picture Show
Best Director:
Ken Russell - The Devils, The Boy Friend

External links 
National Board of Review of Motion Pictures :: Awards for 1971

1971
1971 film awards
1971 in American cinema